Dawa Steven Sherpa is a Nepalese  Sherpa adventurer, entrepreneur and environmentalist, who has scaled Mount Everest three times, as well as other himalayan peaks such as Mount Kanchenjunga, Mount Lhotse, Mt. Cho Oyu, Mount Manaslu, and Mount Pumori He has trekked the entire length of the Nepal Himalaya along the Great Himalaya Trail. He was born in March 1984 and graduated from Heriot-Watt University Scotland with an Honours Degree in Business Administration. Dawa Steven's father, Ang Tshering Sherpa, is a Nepalese Sherpa, and his mother a Belgian. He speaks six languages: Dutch, Nepali, English, Hindi, German and Chinese. Dawa Steven runs Asian Trekking Pvt. Ltd, established by his father in 1982.

His work in the field of environmental protection have been recognised by the International Olympic Committee, World Wildlife Fund (WWF), The Sir Edmund Hillary Foundation of Canada, the International Mountaineering & Climbing Federation (UIAA), and the International Union for Conservation of Nature (IUCN). He started the 'Cash for Trash' cleanup campaign on Everest.

Dawa Steven was featured in WWF-hosted TEDx talk in 2011.

In the aftermath of the devastating earthquake of 2015 in Nepal, Dawa Steven established and led the “Resilient Homes” project, which has built over 700 temporary houses for poor rural families who lost their homes in the disaster. For this work, Dawa was officially recognized for “his extraordinary leadership and immense contribution towards the needy community members “ by the National Reconstruction Authority, Government of Nepal.

Dawa Steven established Astrek Climbing Wall in the center of Kathmandu. Astrek Climbing Wall sponsors and conducts the training of the Nepali national climbing team, who have now represented Nepal in various international competition, including the Climbing World Cup.

Dawa and his late business partner Ted Atkins established TopOut Nepal Pvt. Ltd.

He was the drop zone safety officer and logistics in charge of the world's highest parachute landing at 20,200 ft on 27 October 2019.

He was the lead organiser of the first ice skating and Ice Hockey Event in Nepal. Skate Nepal, as part of the Visit Nepal Year 2020 campaign, at Gokyo Lake (4750m) on 14th Feb. 2020

Membership
 Member, Programme implementation Sub-Committee, Visit Nepal 2020 Campaign, Government of Nepal.

References 

1984 births
Living people
Nepalese mountain climbers
Nepalese people of Belgian descent
Sherpa summiters of Mount Everest
Nepalese Buddhists
Nepalese summiters of Mount Everest